Consortium of Academic and Research Libraries in Illinois is an academic consortium of public and private university and research libraries in the state of Illinois.

History 

The Consortium of Academic and Research Libraries in Illinois (CARLI) began operating on July 1, 2005. CARLI was formed through the consolidation of existing consortia: Illinois Cooperative Collection Management Program (ICCMP), Illinois Digital Academic Library (IDAL), and Illinois Library Computer Systems Organization (ILCSO). The consolidation resulted in efficiencies, cost reductions for members, and allowed for service expansions requested by its member libraries.

Membership and governance 
CARLI has 134 members in 2 membership categories, Governing and Affiliate.

Services 
CARLI provides numerous services to its members, including a consortial catalog known as I-SHARE, digital collections, electronic resources, and collection management including open educational resources.
Interlibrary loan, which includes 24 hour delivery to members, are a key service for participating member libraries.

References 

2005 establishments in Illinois
Library consortia in Illinois